Zygaena formosa  is a species of moth in the Zygaenidae family. It is found in Asia minor, Syria and Turkey.In Seitz it is described. — The colour of the wings of the much smaller [than the similar Zygaena olivieri group ] formosa H.-Sch. (7i), from Asia Minor and Syria, is far lighter pale rosy, the abdomen, however, being black except a narrow belt. — In malatiana Stgr. ( i. 1.) [now Zygaena formosa ssp. malatiana Rebel, 1901 ] (7h)  this belt is broader, comprising the 2—3 penultimate segments; Malatia, east of the Antitaurus.

References

Moths described in 1852
Zygaena